The 1989–90 Washington State Cougars men's basketball team represented Washington State University for the 1989–90 NCAA Division I men's basketball season. Led by third-year head coach Kelvin Sampson, the Cougars were members of the Pacific-10 Conference and played their home games on campus at Beasley Coliseum in Pullman, Washington.

At the conference tournament, the Cougars met seventh seed USC in the first round and lost by seventeen points, ending the season on an eighteen-game losing streak.

Postseason result

|-
!colspan=5 style=| Pacific-10 Tournament

References

External links
Sports Reference – Washington State Cougars: 1989–90 basketball season

Washington State Cougars men's basketball seasons
Washington State Cougars
Washington State
Washington State